Sarnia Chris Hadfield Airport  is located  east northeast of Sarnia, Ontario, Canada. Opened in 1958 for scheduled flights, the airport was renamed in honour of Canadian Space Agency astronaut and Sarnia native Chris Hadfield in 1997.

The airport is classified as an airport of entry by Nav Canada and is staffed by the Canada Border Services Agency (CBSA). CBSA officers at this airport can handle aircraft with no more than 30 passengers.

Scheduled flights to Sarnia ceased in 2020 when the Air Canada Express service to Toronto Pearson Airport was withdrawn amid the COVID-19 pandemic.

References

External links

Certified airports in Ontario
Transport in Sarnia
Buildings and structures in Sarnia
Airports established in 1958
1958 establishments in Ontario